The horned forest frog or horned wrinkled ground frog (Platymantis cornutus) is a species of frog in the family Ceratobatrachidae.
It is endemic to the Philippines, where it is found in the Central Cordilleras of northern Luzon.

Its natural habitats are tropical moist lowland forest, tropical moist montane forest, plantations, rural gardens, and heavily degraded former forest.
It is threatened by habitat loss.

References

Platymantis
Amphibians of the Philippines
Endemic fauna of the Philippines
Taxonomy articles created by Polbot
Amphibians described in 1922